Leptospermum spinescens, commonly known as the spiny tea tree, is a species of spiny shrub that is endemic to Western Australia. It has thick, egg-shaped to elliptical leaves on a short petiole, white or greenish cream flowers, and fruit that remain in the plant for years after reaching maturity.

Description
It has firm but soft, brown, corky, corrugated bark, the younger stems thick, cylindrical and sharply-pointed with conspicuous leaf scars. There are large, reddish brown, more or less round bracteoles at the base of the flower bud but which fall off before the flower opens. Flowering mainly occurs from September to December and the fruit is a capsule  or more wide and remains on the plant for many years, often becoming partly buried in the bark.

Taxonomy and naming
Leptospermum spinescens was first formally described in April 1837 by Stephan Endlicher who published the description in Enumeratio plantarum quas in Novae Hollandiae ora austro-occidentali ad fluvium Cygnorum et in Sinu Regis Georgii collegit Carolus liber baro de Hügel from specimens collectd by Charles von Hügel near King Georges Sound.

Distribution and habitat
Spiny tea tree is found in kwongan or shrubland on hills and sand plains in the Wheatbelt, Great Southern, and southern Goldfields-Esperance regions of Western Australia, where it grows in sandy and lateritic soils.

References

spinescens
Flora of Western Australia
Plants described in 1837
Taxa named by Stephan Endlicher